Aliabad (also Romanized as ‘Alīābād; also known as Bashāgardīyehā (Persian: بشاگرديها) and Alīābād-e Hashtbandī) is a village in Jaghin-e Jonubi Rural District, Jaghin District, Rudan County, Hormozgan Province, Iran. At the 2006 census, its population was 146, in 36 families.

References 

Populated places in Rudan County